Sandvika is the administrative centre of the municipality of Lierne in Trøndelag county, Norway. The main church for northern Lierne, Nordli Church, is located on the northern edge of Sandvika.

References

Villages in Trøndelag
Lierne